Booth Grey (12 February 1783 – 13 April 1850) was an English politician who served in the House of Commons from 1807 to 1812.

Grey was the son of  Booth Grey, of Budworth Magna  and his wife Elizabeth Manwaring, daughter of Charles Manwaring of Brombrough, Cheshire. He was educated at Eton College and matriculated at Brasenose College, Oxford in 1800. He was Captain in the Royal Cheshire militia from 1803 to 1805 and Sheriff of Cheshire in 1811–12.

Grey was elected Member of Parliament for Petersfield in 1807. He did not seek re-election in 1812.

Grey married his cousin Lady Sophia Grey, daughter of George Harry Grey, 5th Earl of Stamford on 21 October 1809. He died on 13 April 1850.

References

1783 births
1850 deaths
UK MPs 1807–1812
People educated at Eton College
Alumni of Brasenose College, Oxford
Members of the Parliament of the United Kingdom for English constituencies